Harold Humbrock (died February 9, 1993) was a sound editor. He was nominated at the 31st Academy Awards in the category of Best Special Effects for the film Torpedo Run. His nomination was shared with A. Arnold Gillespie.

Filmography

 Deep in My Heart (1954)
 Valley of the Kings (1954)
 Bad Day at Black Rock (1955)
 Kismet (1955)
 Moonfleet (1955)
 The Scarlet Coat (1955)
 The Last Hunt (1956)
 Lust for Life (1956)
 The Barretts of Wimpole Street (1957)
 Saddle the Wind (1958)
 Torpedo Run (1958)

References

External links

American sound editors
1993 deaths
Place of birth missing
Place of death missing
1905 births